White Rock is an unincorporated community in the town of Gorham, Maine, in the United States. It formerly had a school, called White Rock Elementary, until it closed in 2011 with the coming of Great Falls Elementary on Route 237. White Rock was named for a large white boulder that once stood in front of the current church. White Rock is home to part of the Mountain Division Trail, a partially completed rail trail with segments that follow the former Mountain Division line between Fryeburg and Portland.

References

Gorham, Maine
Villages in Cumberland County, Maine